Christmas Waltz may refer to:

Film and TV
Christmas Waltz (Mad Men)

Music
Christmas Waltz, album by Richard Clayderman, Günter Noris and André Rieu (2002)

Songs
"Weihnachtswalzer" for piano, by Franz Lehár (1886)
"The Christmas Waltz" by Sammy Cahn and Jule Styne (1954), also recorded as "Christmas Waltz" by Amy Grant, Nancy Wilson, Pat Boone and Chet Baker
"Merry Christmas Waltz" by Gene Autry 
"Our Christmas Waltz" by Red Foley, written by Steve Nelson and Ed Nelson Jr.
"A Waltz for Christmas" by Patrick John Smith (2020)